Siaya is a municipality and the capital of Siaya County, Kenya. The urban center had a population of 33,153 in 2019.

Siaya municipality has five wards: Mjini, Siaya Central, Siaya East, Siaya North and Siaya West. All of them are part of Alego Constituency. With the new constitution, it is now also in Siaya County of which it is also its headquarters.

Notable individuals 
Jared Angira, poet
 Clarke Oduor, footballer

References 

Siaya County
Populated places in Nyanza Province
County capitals in Kenya